A Series of Unfortunate Events is a series of thirteen children's novels written by American author Daniel Handler under the pen name Lemony Snicket. The books follow the turbulent lives of orphaned siblings Violet, Klaus, and Sunny Baudelaire. After their parents' death in a fire, the children are placed in the custody of a murderous relative, Count Olaf, who attempts to steal their inheritance and later, causes numerous disasters with the help of his accomplices as the children attempt to flee. As the plot progresses, the Baudelaires gradually confront further mysteries surrounding their family and deep conspiracies involving a secret society known as the Volunteer Fire Department (or V.F.D.).

Characterized by Victorian Gothic tones and absurdist textuality, the books are noted for their dark humour, sarcastic storytelling, and anachronistic elements, as well as frequent cultural and literary allusions. They have been classified as postmodern and metafictional writing, with the plot evolution throughout the later novels being cited as an exploration of the psychological process of the transition from the innocence of childhood to the moral complexity of maturity. As the series progresses, the Baudelaires must face the reality that their actions have become morally ambiguous, blurring the lines between which characters should be read as "good" or "evil".

Since the release of the first novel, The Bad Beginning, in September 1999, the books have gained significant popularity, critical acclaim, and commercial success worldwide, spawning a film, a video game, assorted merchandise, and a television series. The main thirteen books in the series have collectively sold more than 60 million copies and have been translated into 41 languages. Several companion books set in the same universe of the series have also been released, including Lemony Snicket: The Unauthorized Autobiography, The Beatrice Letters, and the noir prequel tetralogy All the Wrong Questions, which chronicles Snicket's childhood.

Background 
Prior to the publication of A Series of Unfortunate Events, Handler had never written for children. According to an interview with Handler, he was encouraged to try writing children's books by his friend and editor, Susan Rich. In a separate author interview, Daphne Merkin wrote that Handler adapted a manuscript for a "mock-gothic" book originally intended for adults into a series more suited for children. Handler invented the pseudonym "Lemony Snicket" as an inside joke among friends years before the publication of A Series of Unfortunate Events.

Handler acknowledges Edward Gorey and Roald Dahl as influences for his writing style in the series. The first book in the series, The Bad Beginning was released on September 30, 1999.

Series overview

Plot 
The series follows the adventures of three orphaned siblings. Lemony Snicket documents their lives and explains to the readers that very few positive things happen to the children.

The series begins when the orphans are alone at a beach, where they receive news that their parents have been killed in a fire that also destroyed the family mansion. In The Bad Beginning, they are sent to live with a distant relative named Count Olaf after briefly living with Mr. Poe, a banker in charge of the orphans' affairs. The siblings discover that Count Olaf intends to get his hands on the enormous Baudelaire fortune, which Violet is to inherit when she reaches the age of eighteen. In the first book, Olaf attempts to marry Violet to steal the Baudelaire fortune, doing so by pretending that the marriage is the storyline for his latest play. The plan falls through when Violet uses her non-dominant hand to sign the marriage document, thus causing the marriage to be invalidated. After the crowd realizes, Olaf manages to escape with his henchmen.

In the following six books, Olaf disguises himself, finds the children, and, with help from his many accomplices, tries to steal their fortune, committing arson, murder, and other crimes. In books eight through twelve, the orphans adopt disguises while on the run from the police after Count Olaf frames them for a murder he has committed. The Baudelaires routinely try to get help from Mr. Poe, but he, like many of the adults in the series, is oblivious to the dangerous reality of the children's situation.

As the books continue, another running plot is revealed concerning a mysterious secret organization known as the Volunteer Fire Department (V.F.D.). From The Austere Academy onwards, the connections between the Baudelaires, the V.F.D., and their parents' deaths are slowly revealed, leading the siblings to question their previous lives and family history. The siblings become increasingly involved with the organization until they are forced to flee with Count Olaf to an island where Olaf accidentally causes the deaths of himself and possibly the idyllic colonists of the island, whose fates are left unknown. Having finally found a safe place to live, the children spend the next year raising the baby of one of their parents' friends from V.F.D. who died giving birth to the child. After a year, the siblings decide to try to return to the mainland to continue their lives.

Setting 
The books seem to be set in an alternate, "timeless" world with stylistic similarities to both the 19th century and the 1930s, though with contemporary, and seemingly anachronistic scientific knowledge. For instance, in The Hostile Hospital, the Baudelaire children send a message via Morse code on a telegraph, yet the general store they are in has fiber-optic cable for sale. An "advanced computer" appears in The Austere Academy.

Danielle Russell, a professor at Glendon College, argues that the settings are reflective of familiar places, but are "bizarre" enough that young readers feel distanced from the world of the Baudelaires. The setting of the world has been compared to Edward Scissorhands in that it is "suburban gothic". While the film version sets the Baudelaire mansion in the city of Boston, Massachusetts, real places rarely appear in the books, though some are mentioned. For example, in The Ersatz Elevator, a book in Jerome and Esmé Squalor's library was titled Trout, in France They're Out. There are also references to the fictional nobility of North American regions, specifically the Duchess of Winnipeg and the King of Arizona.

Characters 
Violet Baudelaire, the oldest child in the series, uses her inventive mind to create various helpful items, showcasing her talent and resourcefulness. Klaus Baudelaire, the middle child, is twelve when the series begins; he loves all types of books and is an extraordinary speed reader with a photographic memory. Sunny Baudelaire is a baby at the beginning of the series and enjoys biting things with her abnormally large and sharp teeth; she develops a love for cooking later in the series.

In most books, the children's skills are used to help them defeat Count Olaf's plots; for instance, Violet invents a lockpick in The Reptile Room. Occasionally, the children must switch roles, such as when Klaus must try inventing and Violet reading in The Miserable Mill. Other characters (usually other children) also have particular skills that they use to assist the Baudelaires, for example, Duncan Quagmire used his journaling skills to remember important information, Isadora wrote poems to pass notes, and Quigley Quagmire's cartography skills help Violet and Klaus in The Slippery Slope.

Snicket translates for the youngest Baudelaire orphan, Sunny, who in the early books almost solely uses words or phrases that make sense only to her siblings. As the series progresses, her speech often contains disguised meanings. Some words are spelled phonetically: 'Suruchi' in The Slippery Slope and 'Kikuchi?' in The End; some are spelled backwards: '' in The Carnivorous Carnival, and '' in The Miserable Mill. Others contain references to culture or people: for instance, when Sunny says "Bushenyi" (combining the last names of George W. Bush and Dick Cheney, presumably), it is followed by the definition of "you are a vile man who has no regard for anyone else". Some words Sunny uses are foreign, such as "Shalom", "Sayonara", or "Arrête". Some are more complex, such as when she says "Akrofil, meaning, 'they were not afraid of heights'", which phonetically translates to acrophilia, meaning one who loves heights. She begins to use standard English words towards the end of the books, one of her longer sentences being "I'm not a baby" in The Slippery Slope.

When asked in a Moment Magazine interview about the Baudelaire children and Snicket's own Jewish heritage he replied, "Oh yeah! Yes. The Baudelaires are Jewish! I guess we would not know for sure, but we would strongly suspect it, not only from their manner but from the occasional mention of a rabbi or bar mitzvah or synagogue. The careful reader will find quite a few rabbis."

Literary analysis

Allusions 

While the books are marketed primarily to children, the series features numerous references that adults or older children are more likely to understand.

Many of the characters' names allude to other fictional works or real people with macabre connections. For example, The Reptile Room includes allusions to Monty Python (the Baudelaire children's uncle Monty has a large snake collection that includes a python, and a reference to the "Self-Defence Against Fresh Fruit" sketch). The Baudelaire orphans are named after Charles Baudelaire; Violet's name also comes from the T. S. Eliot's poem The Waste Land, specifically its verses concerning the "violet hour", and Sunny and Klaus take their first names from Claus and Sunny von Bülow, while Mr. Poe is a reference to Edgar Allan Poe (his sons are named Edgar and Albert). In the seventh installment, The Vile Village, Count Olaf's disguise, Detective Dupin, is an allusion to C. Auguste Dupin, a fictional detective created by Edgar Allan Poe.

Isadora and Duncan Quagmire are named after Isadora Duncan, a notorious dancer also remembered for her unusual death by strangulation when her scarf entangled around the wheels of the open car in which she was a passenger. In the fourth book, The Miserable Mill, Dr. Georgina Orwell is a reference to British author George Orwell. Orwell finished his famous book 1984 in 1948, and in the sixth book, The Ersatz Elevator, it is not clear if the skyscraper in which Esmé and Jerome Squalor live has 48 or 84 stories. The Squalors' names reference Jerome David "J. D." Salinger and his short story For Esmé – with Love and Squalor, while in an auction on which the plot hinges, Lot 49 is skipped, i.e. not cried, an allusion to Thomas Pynchon's The Crying of Lot 49. Both Salinger and Pynchon were reputed at one time not to be actual persons. The ninth book in the series, The Carnivorous Carnival, takes place at Caligari Carnival; the carnival's name is a nod to the 1920 silent horror film The Cabinet of Dr. Caligari. Also in the ninth book, Hugo the Hunchback's name is an allusion to French author Victor Hugo, who wrote the famous book The Hunchback of Notre Dame. Subsequently, many of the inhabitants of the island in which the Baudelaires find themselves on in The End are named after characters from The Tempest, a play by William Shakespeare, while some are named after characters from Robinson Crusoe, Moby-Dick and others after general nautical or island-based literature. The Fire and the Sugar Bowl was inspired by We Have Always Lived in the Castle by Shirley Jackson.

The name of Beatrice, Snicket's dedicatee, may be an allusion to the poem La Beatrice by Charles Baudelaire. The poem references an "actor without a job", like the actor Count Olaf. The poem also begins with the line "In a burnt, ash-grey land without vegetation", similar to the Baudelaire mansion burning down at the beginning of the series. The name Beatrice could also be an allusion to Italian poet Dante. Dante dedicated all of his works to "Beatrice", with whom he was obsessed, and who was also dead, like Snicket's Beatrice.

In the final book, in an allusion to the Book of Genesis, a snake offers the children a life-giving apple (which the other characters in The End refuse to eat despite the fact that it is a cure for a fatal illness).

Feminist critique 
Tison Pugh argues that the series challenges traditional gender roles and norms. The Baudelaire children's ability to traverse these gender lines causes them to become "hermaphroditic" characters who embody multiple genders at once.

Genre 
This series is most commonly classified as children's fiction, but the book has also been classified in more specific genres such as gothic fiction, or some variety thereof, whether it is mock-gothic, a satire of gothic literature, neo-Victorian or "suburban gothic". The series has been described as absurdist fiction, because of its strange characters, improbable storylines, and black comedy.

The books can be categorized as mystery novels. According to Chris McGee, the Baudelaires spend the series trying to uncover the truth about their parents’ deaths. He also likens the series to noir fiction. Danielle Russell argues that mysteries are solved for the reader by their end. So, the lack of clear answers in The End does not align with this genre.

Although the series does not neatly fit into the genres of fantasy or science fiction, it does feature occasional instances of whimsy, the supernatural, and steampunk technology. There is a constant theme of some form of fate guiding the characters throughout the books. The Baudelaires are capable of communicating with their infant sister, as well as with reptiles. The Reptile Room houses a variety of fantastical reptiles, including the Incredibly Deadly Viper, which is extremely intelligent and seems to have a humanoid consciousness. There is a mysterious aquatic monster known as the Bombinating Beast.

In a paper for the Maria Curie-Sklodowski University, Barbara Kaczyńska claims that "realism" is absent within the series. Russell disputes this, noting that throughout the novels the narrator insists that the stories he recounts are completely true. She believes that this strong level of realism discredits any argument that the books can be classified as fantasies.

Morality in the series 
Social commentary is a major element in the books, which often comment on the seemingly inescapable follies of human nature. The books consistently present the Baudelaire children as free-thinking and independent, while the adults around them obey authority and succumb to mob psychology, peer pressure, ambition, and other social ills. A high account is given to learning: those who are "well-read" are often sympathetic characters, while those who shun knowledge are villains.

Tison Pugh argues that the central issue of the series is whether the Baudelaires are morally good and distinct from the villains of the story, or whether their actions make them as morally ambiguous as the so-called evil characters. The books have strong themes of moral relativism.

Evil characters are shown to have sympathetic characteristics. Similarly, good characters' flaws become major problems. The books highlight the inevitability of temptation and moral decision-making, regardless of the external situation. This indicates that regardless of one's outside influences, one always has the final choice in whether to be good or bad. Characters that make brave decisions to fight back and take charge are almost always "good", and characters that just go along end up as "bad." However, some characters suggest that people are neither good nor bad, but a mix of both. Rebecca-Anne C. Do Rozario notes the nihilistic tone of the series, claiming the lines between good and evil acts become blurred to the point where they become meaningless.

Narration style 

The series is narrated by Lemony Snicket, the pseudonym of Daniel Handler. He dedicates each of his works to his deceased love interest, Beatrice, and often attempts to dissuade the reader from reading the Baudelaires' unfortunate story. Handler has referred to Lemony Snicket as a "character" who also doubles as the series' narrator. Some details of his life are explained somewhat in a supplement to the series, Lemony Snicket: The Unauthorized Autobiography.

When Snicket describes a word, the reader may be unfamiliar with, he typically prefaces it with the saying "a word which here means . . . ." He sometimes follows this phrase with a humorous definition, or one that is relevant only to the events at hand (for example, he describes "adversity" as meaning "Count Olaf").

Lemony Snicket continuously maintains that the story is true and that it is his "solemn duty" to record it. Snicket often goes off into humorous or satirical asides, discussing his opinions or personal life.

Lemony Snicket's narration and commentary are characteristically cynical and despondent. In the blurb for each book, Snicket warns of the misery the reader may experience in reading about the Baudelaire orphans and suggests abandoning the books altogether. However, he also provides ample comic relief with wry, dark humor. Snicket's narration has been described as "self-conscious" and "post-modern". Daphne Merkin characterizes Snicket's narration style as "droll and detached."

When describing a character whom the Baudelaires have met before, Snicket often describes the character first and does not reveal the name of the character until they have been thoroughly described. Lemony Snicket starts each book with a "post-modern dissection of the reading experience" before linking it back to how he presents the story of the Baudelaires and what their current situation is. Snicket often uses alliteration to name locations, as well as book titles, throughout the story. Many of the books start with a theme being introduced that is continually referenced throughout the book—such as the repeated comparisons of the words "nervous" and "anxious" in The Ersatz Elevator, the consistent use of the phrase "where there's smoke, there's fire" in The Slippery Slope, and the descriptions of the water cycle in The Grim Grotto.

Repetition 
The plots of the first seven books follow the same basic pattern: the Baudelaires go to a new guardian in a new location, where Count Olaf appears and attempts to steal their fortune. The books following pick up where the previous book ended. There are thirteen books in the series and each book has thirteen chapters. The last book in the series, The End, contains two stories: The End, which has 13 chapters, and a separate "book" that is titled Chapter Fourteen. The location of each book's events is usually identified in the book's title; the first twelve book titles are generally alliterative.

Secrets in the series 

After the fourth book, Barbara Kaczyńska argues that secrets play a more important role in the story. In the final book, The End, the concept is especially important, as demonstrated by a several-page-long discussion of the phrase "in the dark." The children hear of a massive schism within the organization of V.F.D., which was once noble but became filled with corruption and split into two sides, "volunteers" and "villains." While many of the critical plot points are given answers, Snicket explains that no story can be fully devoid of questions as every story is intertwined with numerous others and every character's history is shared in a great web of mysteries and unfortunate events that make up the world's legacy, making it impossible for anyone to know all the answers to every question. The Baudelaire children and Count Olaf's story is said to be merely a fragment of a much bigger story between numerous characters with the central connection being the organization of V.F.D.

Transtextuality 
There is a full-page picture at the end of each book, showing a hint or clue about the content of the next book. This may show a flyer or piece of paper drifting by, though sometimes by a significant object: a snake appears at the end of The Bad Beginning, referring to Montgomery's snake collection in the following book. The same picture is used at the start of the succeeding book. This practice continued at the end of The End which shows a boat sailing off into the sunset and at the start of Chapter Fourteen. The picture at the end of Chapter Fourteen includes a shape of a question mark.

Following the picture is a letter to the editor, which explains to the editor how to get a manuscript of the next book. Snicket is writing from the location of the next book and usually reveals its title. Snicket notes that the editors will find various objects along with the manuscript, all of them having some impact in the story. Starting with the fourth book (which previews the fifth), each letter has a layout relating to the next book, such as torn edges, fancy stationery, sopping wet paper, or telegram format. The letters change dramatically starting with the letter at the end of The Hostile Hospital—for this preview letter, the letter is ripped to shreds and only a few scraps remain. The remaining letters are difficult to read, and some do not reveal the title. The final letter appears at the end of The End and simply has "The end of THE END can be found at the end of THE END." There is no letter after Chapter Fourteen.

Each book begins with a dedication to a woman named Beatrice, and references to her are made by Snicket throughout the series, describing her as the woman he still loves while emphasizing the fact that she apparently died long ago. At the end of the Chapter Fourteen epilogue, it is revealed that Beatrice was the Baudelaires' late mother, who married their father after an unknown event caused her to return Snicket's engagement ring, alongside a two-hundred-page book explaining all the reasons she could not marry him.

Distribution

Books 
The series includes thirteen novels as follows below:

 The Bad Beginning (1999)
 The Reptile Room (1999)
 The Wide Window (2000)
 The Miserable Mill (2000)
 The Austere Academy (2000)
 The Ersatz Elevator (2001)
 The Vile Village (2001)
 The Hostile Hospital (2001)
 The Carnivorous Carnival (2002)
 The Slippery Slope (2003)
 The Grim Grotto (2004)
 The Penultimate Peril (2005)
 The End (2006)

Appearance 
In an article about children's literature, Bruce Butt describes the hardcover books as "elegant" and "collectible." He notes that the endpapers and overall book design resemble Victorian-era novels. Danielle Russell argues that the visual stylization of the books adds to their sense of timelessness. The hardcover books were printed with a deckle edge.

There was an initial paperback release of the series, featuring restyled covers, new illustrations, and a serial supplement entitled The Cornucopian Cavalcade with The Bad Beginning: or, Orphans!, The Reptile Room: or, Murder!, and The Wide Window: or, Disappearance!. However, the release was stopped after the third.

Accompanying books 
There are books that accompany the series, such as The Beatrice Letters, Lemony Snicket: The Unauthorized Autobiography, and The Puzzling Puzzles; journals The Blank Book and The Notorious Notations; and short materials such as The Dismal Dinner and 13 Shocking Secrets You'll Wish You Never Knew About Lemony Snicket. Humorous quotes from the series were used in a book published under the Snicket name, Horseradish: Bitter Truths You Can't Avoid.

All the Wrong Questions 

Lemony Snicket's All the Wrong Questions is a four-part young adult series focused on the character, Snicket's childhood working for V.F.D. It is set in the same universe as A Series of Unfortunate Events and features several of the same characters and locations. The first book was titled Who Could That Be at This Hour?, and was released in October 2012. The second, When Did You See Her Last?, was released in October 2013, and the third, Shouldn't You Be in School?, was released in September 2014. The final book, Why Is This Night Different from All Other Nights?, was released on September 29, 2015.

In other media

Television 

Netflix, in association with Paramount Television, announced in November 2014 its plans to adapt the books into an original TV series with 25 total episodes spanning 3 seasons, with 2 episodes dedicated to each book, with the exception of the 13th book, The End. Author Daniel Handler serves as a writer and executive producer.

On September 4, 2015, it was announced that filmmaker Barry Sonnenfeld and True Blood showrunner Mark Hudis had agreed to helm the series. Hudis would serve as showrunner, Sonnenfeld as director, and both as executive producers with Daniel Handler penning the scripts. On December 3, 2015, an open casting call was announced for the roles of Violet and Klaus Baudelaire, with the casting call confirming that the series would begin production in March 2016.

In January 2016, Netflix announced that Hudis had left the project. However, it was announced that Sonnenfeld and Handler were both still on board, and that Neil Patrick Harris had been cast as Count Olaf and Malina Weissman and Louis Hynes as Violet and Klaus.

In March 2016, K. Todd Freeman and Patrick Warburton were cast as Mr. Poe and Lemony Snicket respectively. The first season, consisting of eight episodes that cover the first four books, was released worldwide on Netflix on January 13, 2017. A Series of Unfortunate Events was renewed for a second season, which was released on March 30, 2018, and consisted of ten episodes that adapt books five through nine of the novel series. The television series was also renewed for a third and final season, which was released on January 1, 2019, consisting of seven episodes that adapted the final four books. The last book, The End, was adapted into one episode instead of the standard two episodes.

Film 

Lemony Snicket's A Series of Unfortunate Events is a film adaptation of the first three titles in the series, mixing the various events and characters into one story. It was released in United States on December 17, 2004 by Paramount Pictures and Internationally by DreamWorks Pictures. Directed by Brad Seiberling, it stars Jim Carrey as Count Olaf, Meryl Streep as Aunt Josephine, Billy Connolly as Uncle Monty, Emily Browning as Violet, Liam Aiken as Klaus, Timothy Spall as Mr. Poe, and Jude Law as the voice of Lemony Snicket. The film was financially successful, but received criticism over its comical tone.

Considering the success of the movie, the director and some of the lead actors hinted that they were keen on making a sequel, but no script was written.

Browning has said that further films would have to be produced quickly, as the children do not age much throughout the book series.

In 2008, Daniel Handler stated in a Bookslut Interview that another film was in the works, but had been delayed by corporate shake-ups at Paramount Pictures. In June 2009, Silberling confirmed he still talked about the project with Handler, and suggested the sequel be a stop motion film because the lead actors have grown too old. "In an odd way, the best thing you could do is actually have Lemony Snicket say to the audience, 'Okay, we pawned the first film off as a mere dramatization with actors. Now I'm afraid I'm going to have to show you the real thing.'"

Video game 

Lemony Snicket's A Series of Unfortunate Events is a video game based on the film that was released in 2004 by Adenium Games and Activision for PlayStation 2, GameCube, Xbox, Game Boy Advance, and PC. The player plays as all three orphans at points in the game, and encounters characters such as Mr. Poe, Uncle Monty and Aunt Josephine, along with villains such as Count Olaf, the Hook-Handed Man, the White-Faced Women, and the Bald Man. The game, like the movie, follows only the first three books in the series.

A separate casual game titled A Series of Unfortunate Events was published by Oberon Media the same year as a different tie-in to the books. Set in Count Olaf's house, the game involves his six associates and many objects they use in Olaf's efforts to capture the children. Gameplay includes three difficulty levels and two game modes: Deduction Junction and Swap Monster.

Board games 
A board game based on the books was distributed by Mattel in 2004, prior to the movie. The Perilous Parlor Game is for 2–4 players, ages 8 and up. One player assumes the role of Count Olaf, and the other players play the Baudelaire children. Count Olaf's objective in the game is to eliminate the guardian, while the children try to keep the guardian alive. The game employs Clever Cards, Tragedy Cards, Secret Passage Tiles, and Disguise Tiles in play.

Card games 
The Catastrophic Card Game is the second game based on the books. In this card game, players are looking to complete sets of characters. There are 4 different sets: The Baudelaire Orphans, Count Olaf in Disguise, Olaf's Henchmen, and the Orphans Confidants. Players take turns drawing a card from either the draw pile or the top card from the discard pile in hopes of completing their sets. For 2–4 players, ages 14 and under.

Audio

Audio books 
Most of the series of unabridged audiobooks are read by British actor Tim Curry, though Handler as Lemony Snicket reads books 3 to 5. Of narrating the audiobooks, Handler has said: "It was very, very hard. It was unbelievably arduous. It was the worst kind of arduous." As such, future narrating duties were handed back to Curry, of whom Handler states: "he does a splendid job". The "Dear Reader" blurb is usually read by Handler (as Snicket) at the beginning, although it is missing in The Hostile Hospital. Handler usually reads the "To my Kind Editor" blurb about the next book at the end. Starting at The Carnivorous Carnival, there is another actor who replaces Handler in reading the two blurbs, although they are skipped entirely in The Grim Grotto. All of the recordings include a loosely related song by The Gothic Archies, a novelty band of which Handler is a member, featuring lyrics by Handler's Magnetic Fields bandmate Stephin Merritt.

Album 

In October 2006, The Tragic Treasury: Songs from A Series of Unfortunate Events by The Gothic Archies was released. The album is a collection of thirteen songs written and performed by Stephin Merritt (of The Magnetic Fields), each one originally appearing on one of the corresponding thirteen audiobooks of the series. Two bonus songs are included.

Reception

Reviews 
Reviews for A Series of Unfortunate Events have generally been positive, with reviewers saying that the series is enjoyable for children and adults alike, and that it brings fresh and adult themes to children's stories. The Times Online refer to the books as "a literary phenomenon", and discuss how the plight of the Baudelaire orphans helps children cope with loss—citing the rise in sales post September 11, 2001 as evidence. Mackey attributes the series' success to the "topsy-turvy moral universe." Langbauer feels that the series "offers a critique of the pieties" of earlier generations and imparts "its own vision of ethics." In a May 2000 article for Publishers Weekly, Sally Lodge notes kids and educators' enthusiasm for the first four books in the series.

Criticism 

The series has come under criticism from some school districts for its dark themes. Access to the books was similarly restricted at Katy ISD Elementary School in Katy, Texas. Similarly, a school in Decatur, Georgia criticized The Reptile Room for its inclusion of the word "damn", canceling an author event with Handler in protest.

Criticisms include the suggested incest in Olaf's attempt to marry his distant cousin Violet in The Bad Beginning. The series has also been criticized for its formulaic and repetitive storytelling. For example, Bruce Butt criticizes the series for its formulaic and predictable nature, likening the first eight books to "junk food" for children.

Sales 

Within a year of The Bad Beginning's publication, the first four books in the series had a combined printing of 125,000 copies. A Series of Unfortunate Events has been printed in 41 different languages, selling at least sixty-five million copies as of 2015.

Awards 
The Bad Beginning won multiple literary awards, including the Colorado Children's Book Award, the Nevada Young Readers Award and the Nene Award. It was also a finalist for the Book Sense Book of the Year.

Its sequels have continued this trend, garnering multiple awards and nominations. Among these are three IRA/CBC Children's Choice Awards, which it received for The Wide Window, The Vile Village, and The Hostile Hospital. The Penultimate Peril won a best book prize at the Nickelodeon Kids' Choice Awards, and a 2006 Quill Book Award.

Book lists 
While not technically awards, The Ersatz Elevator was named a Book Sense 76 Pick, and The Grim Grotto is an Amazon.com Customers' Favorite.

See also 
 Lemony Snicket bibliography
 Charles Baudelaire - French poet

References

Bibliography

External links 

 Official website
 
 Daniel Handler's official website
 A Series of Unfortunate Events on Netflix

 
Book series introduced in 1999
Absurdist fiction
Black comedy books
British Book Award-winning works
American children's novels
Novels about orphans
Series of children's books
HarperCollins books
Postmodern novels